Pembleton may refer to:
Arthur Pembleton, English footballer
Martin Pembleton, English footballer
Frank Pembleton, a fictional homicide detective on the television drama series Homicide: Life on the Street
Lonzie Pembleton, boxer
Pembleton Motor Company, an English car-selling company